Rudra: Boom Chik Chik Boom, or simply Rudra is an Indian animated magic fiction television series produced by Green Gold Animation, Cosmos Entertainment Maya Digital Studios, Studio 56 & Hi-Tech Animation for Nickelodeon. It premiered on 11 June 2018 on Nickelodeon.The show is about a nine-year-old boy who is learning how to harness his true powers. The show was launched simultaneously in eight Indian languages — Hindi, Tamil, Telugu, Kannada, Bengali, Gujarati, Malayalam and Marathi. But This Show Originally Release In Hindi Language. The directors are Akshay Sanjeev Chavan, and the animation directors are Rishi Chadha and Sumit Das. The theme song is written by the famous Bollywood lyricist Gulzar, composed by  Simaab Sen and sang by Arhaan Hussain.

Plot
The story is about a 9-year-old magician named Rudra, who lives in the magical city of Sun City with his grandfather Jai Singh Chauhan. The series revolves around Rudra and his best friends Maira and Varun learning new magic every day from Rudra's grandfather (Jai Singh Chauhan)  and their magic school (Advance Magic Academy) to use the magic to defeat the evil magician Shakaal and other evil magicians, who are always stirring up trouble in town and their school to stop Rudra from harnessing his true powers. Rudra is the hero of Sun City and his school.

Location
The series is premised in the fictional magical cities named Sun City and Kaal City and in the fictional magical school named Advance Magic Academy .

Sun City
Sun City is a quaint little peaceful town full of happiness and good-hearted people. It has laughter-filled funfairs, a bustling market area, beautiful magical-looking houses, a giant library, and overlooking it all is Jai Singh Chauhan's massive castle.

Kaal City
Kaal City on the other hand is the darker side of the town. It is ruled by Shakaal and people there are often unhappy with a load of robberies and wrongdoings that go on in the town.

There is a large stadium between the two cities where kids from the cities often compete against each other in a flying soccer game.

Advance Magic Academy
Advance Magic Academy is a new location for Rudra which appears in the new episodes. It consists of a big hall, many classrooms, hostels for students, beautiful garden, two big play ground and the principal's cabin. Many students who have magical power come here to learn new magic tricks.

Broadcast

Cast

Characters

Main Characters 
Rudra (main hero): Rudra is the true successor of the powers and kingdom of Jai Singh Chauhan and the only son of Prince Yuvraj and Princess Yuvrina. Rudra is a kind-hearted, brave, intelligent 9-year-old smart and handsome boy, who is eventually seen as the brave guardian of Sun City. He challenges himself to be a better magician. Rudra always focuses on his magic and believes in himself. Rudra always sacrifices his life for his grandfather and his friends. He is extremely hard working and always striving to learn what his grandfather teaches him. There is a special quality in Rudra, if he determines to do something, he leaves it after completing it. Rudra never gives up, no matter how big the trouble. That's why he is called a Legend. Rudra is a true friend and an ideal grandson. He is a good-hearted, friendly, nice, and charming boy. Also, he is empathetic, forgiving, committed, and trustworthy. He is the best friend of Maira and Varun. He secretly falls in love with  maira. Rudra is the best student of Advanced Magic Academy.

Maira: Maira is Rudra's only girl best friend. She unconditionally falls in love with Rudra. She loves Rudra 
more than her life and cares him so much. She is always ready to sacrifice her life for saving Rudra. She always cares about Rudra and always accompanies him in his trouble and adventures. She gives Rudra inspiration and advice in dangerous situations. Maira is a pretty,charming,intelligent, and determined girl. She is always eager to help Rudra with her magic but unfortunately her magic often misfires in trouble and lands on Varun. But this never discourages her from helping Rudra. Because sometimes her magic works very well and helps Rudra. Maira becomes very angry when Marina jumps onto Rudra's lap. She is a very good student of Advance Magic Academy.

Varun: Varun is Rudra's best friend. He is the same age as Rudra. He always cares about Rudra and Maira. He is a bit coward. So, sometimes in dangerous situation he leaves Rudra to save himself. Also, he often becomes the target of Maira's magic. That's why he tries to stop Maira from doing magic. Varun becomes very angry when Maira's magic lands on him. Varun is a good student of Advance Magic Academy.

Main villain 
Shakaal: Shakaal is the ruler of Kaal city. He desires to capture sun city and he is the master of dark magical forces. Nobody of the Kaal city people like him. Everyone in Kaal city is scared of him. He always tries to put Jai Singh Chauhan and Rudra in danger and tries to kill Rudra and his best friends. But whenever he is in danger, he takes the help of Jai Singh Chauhan and Rudra.

Main Supporting Characters 

Jai Singh Chauhan: He is the patriarch of Sun City and Rudra's loving grandfather. Not does only he want to raise  Rudra as a good human being, but he also wishes to make him the guardian of Sun City. He is the protector of the town and is lovingly called “Dadaji” by the entire town.

Rangeela: Rangeela is Jai Singh's loyal henchman and house helper. He is an optimistic magician, who is not so powerful. He wishes to learn magic from Jai Singh but Jai Singh doesn't believe him to be ready and powerful enough. In an attempt to learn, he secretly tries to imitate the magician and learn the tricks, but the spells tend to backfire. He is the caretaker of Jai Singh's Palace. He loves Jai Singh, Ching Li, Rudra, Maira, and Varun.

Shakleena: She is the sister of Shakaal and mother of Jenny and Joddy. She works as a teacher at Advanced Magic Academy. She is more evil and shrewd than Shakaal.

Joddy: Joddy is Jenny's brother and son of Shakleena. He likes to annoy Rudra-Maira-Varun and put them in danger. But sometimes he makes friends with them. He wants to be a hero like Rudra but he fails. He is also a student of Advance Magic Academy.

Jenny: Jenny is Joddy's sister and daughter of Shakleena. She likes to annoy Rudra-Maira-Varun and put them in danger. But sometimes she also makes friends with them like her brother. She wants to be a powerful magician like Rudra but she also fails like her brother. She is also a student of Advance Magic Academy.

Madam Kanungo: She is the principal of Advance Magic Academy school.

Other Supporting Characters  

Zoga: The right-hand man of Shakaal, he is a comedian and has a hunch back. He says "Zoga can't do this" every time Shakaal gives an order.

Ching Li:  Ching Li is the chef of Sun city palace and also has the power to control kitchen utensils.

Sapola: Sapola is Shakaal's spy snake but remains disguised as Shakaal's wooden staff. He can fly when needed and carries out all the work that Shakaal entrusts him.

Zim and Zum: They are Rudra's pet squirrels. They can talk and they have the power to control natural vegetation. They can smell and find if any danger is near them. They have mostly smelled and found Sapola the snake spying on Rudra and Jai Singh Chauhan.

Alazaar Sir: Alazaar Sir is the Magician librarian of the Magical Books library. He is a very wise man and provides information to Rudra about magical books.

Book Protector: Book protector is the guard of Magical Books library.

Mr. Jolly: He is the Vice Principal of Advance Magic Academy.

Miss Melody:  She is the Music teacher of Advance Magic Academy.

Mr. Mechtician: He is the Science teacher of Advance Magic  Academy.

Mr. Strong: He is the PT teacher of Advance Magic Academy.

Miss Security:  She is the Head of Security of Advance Magic Academy. She gives detention to the students for breaking the rules of Advance Magic Academy. She is a smart and intelligent woman.

Occasional Characters 

Eagle Men:  They are the guards of the Advance Magic Academy, who protect the academy from evils.

Sandy: Sandy is a friend of Jenny-Joddy.He also likes to annoy Rudra-Maira-Varun and put them in danger. He is another student of Advance Magic Academy and a classmate of Rudra, Maira, and Varun.

Marina: Marina is the princess of Mermaid Land. She has a crush on Rudra since she first saw him. Whenever she comes to visit Rudra she jumps on Rudra's lap and she likes to do it. But Maira can never tolerate it and she tries to keep Rudra away from Marina.

Appu: He is another student of Advance Magic Academy. His father is a peon of Advanced Magic Academy. Appu is not a good student and can't do anything. That's why nobody becomes his friend. He always plays games on his mobile. Also, when he gets angry fire comes out of his body.

Prince Yuvraj: Yuvraj is the son of Jai Singh Chauhan and father of Rudra. He is an earth protector. He has a weakness- if he touches anything, it burns.

Princess Yuvrina: Princess Yuvrina is the wife of king Yuvraj and mother of Rudra. She is also an earth protector. She also has a weakness- if she touches anything, it burns.

Movies

Episodes

Season 1

Season 2

Season 3

Season 4

Season 5

Season 6

See also

 Green Gold Animations
 Shiva (TV series)
 Kicko & Super Speedo
 Pinaki & Happy - The Bhoot Bandhus
Nickelodeon India

References

2018 Indian television series debuts
Indian children's animated adventure television series
Hindi-language Nickelodeon original programming
Nickelodeon (Indian TV channel) original programming
Animated television series about children
Indian children's animated fantasy television series